Martin Edralin is a Canadian film director. His first short film, Hole, won the Canadian Screen Award for Best Live Action Short Drama at the 3rd Canadian Screen Awards in 2015, the Grand Prix at the 2015 Clermont-Ferrand International Short Film Festival in 2015, and a jury award at the 2014 Locarno Festival.

His second short film, Emma, was named to the Toronto International Film Festival's year-end Canada's Top Ten list in 2016, and won First Prize at the 2017 Rhode Island International Film Festival.

His feature film debut, Islands, premiered at the 2021 SXSW and was awarded Special Jury Recognition for Breakthrough Performance. Islands was nominated at the 10th Canadian Screen Awards in the categories of Best Actor, Best Supporting Actor, and the John Dunning Best First Feature Award.

References

External links

Film directors from Ontario
Directors of Genie and Canadian Screen Award winners for Best Live Action Short Drama
Canadian people of Filipino descent
Living people
Year of birth missing (living people)
Asian-Canadian filmmakers